German submarine U-551 was a Type VIIC U-boat of Nazi Germany's Kriegsmarine during World War II. The submarine was laid down on 21 November 1939 at the Blohm & Voss yard in Hamburg as yard number 527, launched on 14 September 1940, and commissioned on 7 November 1940 under the command of Kapitänleutnant Karl Schrott.

Design
German Type VIIC submarines were preceded by the shorter Type VIIB submarines. U-551 had a displacement of  when at the surface and  while submerged. She had two shafts and two  propellers.

U-551 was fitted with five  torpedo tubes (four fitted at the bow and one at the stern), fourteen torpedoes, one  SK C/35 naval gun, 220 rounds, and a  C/30 anti-aircraft gun. The boat had a complement of between forty-four and sixty.

Service history
Attached to the 7th U-boat Flotilla, she first sailed from Kiel, Germany to Bergen, Norway, before commencing her first and only war patrol on 18 March 1941. She sailed to the waters south of Iceland, and there on 23 March, in position , she was sunk by depth charges from the British anti-submarine warfare trawler HMT Visenda. All 45 hands were lost.

References

Bibliography

External links

World War II submarines of Germany
German Type VIIC submarines
U-boats commissioned in 1940
U-boats sunk in 1941
U-boats sunk by depth charges
1940 ships
World War II shipwrecks in the Atlantic Ocean
Ships built in Hamburg
U-boats sunk by British warships
Ships lost with all hands
Maritime incidents in March 1941